Dieterskirchen is a municipality in the district of Schwandorf in Bavaria, Germany.

Neighbouring communities 
The neighbouring communities clockwise: Oberviechtach, Winklarn, Thanstein, Neunburg vorm Wald, Schwarzhofen and Niedermurach.

References

Schwandorf (district)